John D. Kimmey (May 21, 1828 – ?) was Warden of the Borough of Norwalk, Connecticut from 1892 to 1893.

Early life and family 
He born May 21, 1828 in Coeymans, New York, the son of David I. Kimmey and Maria Niver. He married Adeline Hoyt on October 14, 1849.

Political career 
In 1880, he was first vice president of the Republican Party for New York's 23rd assembly district.

In 1881, he was elected an alternate to the New York Republican Convention.

In 1886, he moved to Norwalk.

In 1888, he was a member of the board of directors of the American Loan and Trust Company of 113 Broadway, New York City.

He was an investor and director of the Roton Point Improvement Company.

In 1901, he was an original incorporator of the South Norwalk Trust Company.

He was chairman of the Norwalk Sewers Committee.

Associations 
 Member, Masonic Lodge
 Member, Norwalk Club

References 

1828 births
Year of death missing
Place of death missing
Connecticut city council members
Connecticut Republicans
Mayors of Norwalk, Connecticut
New York (state) Republicans
People from Coeymans, New York